"And What Will We Do Tomorrow" is a short story by Orson Scott Card. It first appeared in his short story collection Capitol and then later in The Worthing Saga.

Plot summary
Mother, the empress of Capitol, wakes up from suspended animation for her one waking day every five years and meets with all of her ministers.  All of them try lying to her, except for the minister of colonization, who does not know anything about what is going on in his department.  She sends him away and asks to meet with his assistant minister, Abner Doon.  When they are alone, Abner admits that he secretly runs the entire empire and that he is going to tear it apart and make it into something better.  Mother agrees not to try to stop him if he agrees to take her with him.  After firing all the people who lied to her, she goes back to sleep using the fictional drug Somec.

Connection to the Worthing Saga
This story uses several plot elements also used in The Worthing Saga, such as the sleeping drug Somec and the taping of memories.  It takes place on the planet Capitol sometime after the events in the story "Burning".  In this story it is learned that Mother's real name is Rachel Crove and that she is the granddaughter of Jerry Crove the main character in the story "A Thousand Deaths".

See also

List of works by Orson Scott Card
Orson Scott Card

External links
 The official Orson Scott Card website

1978 short stories
Short stories by Orson Scott Card